Manuel Herrera y Obes (1806–1890) was an Uruguayan politician and diplomat, and one of the main leaders of the government of Montevideo ("La Defensa") during the Uruguayan civil war ("La Guerra Grande"). He was Minister of Finance from 1852 to 1853. 

Colorado Party (Uruguay) politicians
University of the Republic (Uruguay) rectors
Foreign ministers of Uruguay
Ministers of Economics and Finance of Uruguay
Uruguayan diplomats
1806 births
1890 deaths
Uruguayan people of Canarian descent
Place of birth missing